Make Me a Believer may refer to:
"Make Me a Believer", a song by Luther Vandross from the album Busy Body, 1983
"Make Me a Believer", a song by Crossfade from the album We All Bleed, 2011
"Make Me a Believer", a song by Andy Mineo from the album Uncomfortable, 2015